Ignacio "Nacho" Castro García (born 30 June 1971) is a Spanish retired footballer who played mainly as a defensive midfielder, and is a manager, most recently of San Fernando CD.

Playing career
Born in Avilés, Asturias, Castro began his career with local side Real Avilés, making his senior debut in 1989 at the age of just 18 and establishing himself as a starter in the following year, as his side achieved promotion from Segunda División B. He made his professional debut on 9 September 1990, playing the last 26 minutes in a 0–2 Segunda División away loss against Elche CF.

Castro scored his first professional goal on 26 May 1991, netting his team's third in a 3–3 home draw against Palamós CF. In 1992, after suffering relegation, he moved to fellow second division side FC Barcelona B.

After leaving Barça in 1995, Castro resumed his career mainly in the third division, representing Deportivo de La Coruña B, Avilés (two stints), Real Murcia, Real Jaén, Real Ávila CF, Zamora CF, UD Lanzarote, UD Fuerteventura, Logroñés CF and CD Orientación Marítima. He then signed for Tercera División side CD Eldense in 2007, before retiring with Primera Catalana side AD Guíxols in 2009.

Coaching career
Immediately after retiring, Castro was named manager of his last side Guíxols. He subsequently worked in the youth sides of EF Sant Feliu before being appointed in charge of CF Peralada in 2011.

On 19 May 2015, after achieving promotion to the fourth division, Castro left Peralada. He took over Girona FC B on 12 June, with the club later becoming the second reserve side behind Peralada.

On 3 July 2016, Castro was appointed manager of CE Farners, but left the following 2 February. He took over UA Horta in the following year, before replacing Gabri at the helm of FC Andorra in the third division on 25 February 2020.

On 18 January 2021, Castro was sacked by Andorra. On 6 July, he was named in charge of San Fernando CD.

Managerial statistics

References

External links

1971 births
Living people
People from Avilés
Footballers from Asturias
Spanish footballers
Association football midfielders
Segunda División players
Segunda División B players
Tercera División players
Primera Catalana players
Real Avilés CF footballers
FC Barcelona Atlètic players
Deportivo Fabril players
Real Murcia players
Real Jaén footballers
Real Ávila CF players
Zamora CF footballers
UD Lanzarote players
Logroñés CF footballers
CD Eldense footballers
Spanish football managers
Primera Federación managers
Segunda División B managers
Tercera División managers
FC Andorra managers